"House Arrest" is a song by British dance group Krush. Released as a single in 1987, it is hailed as one of the forerunners of the British house music scene and became the group's biggest hit, reaching the top 20 charts in at least 8 countries in Europe. The song peaked at No. 3 on the UK Singles Chart, No. 12 in Austria and Belgium, No. 15 in Sweden, No. 7 in the Netherlands,  No. 5 in Germany, No. 2 in Norway, and No. 1 in Switzerland for two weeks in early 1988. It also peaked at No. 31 in New Zealand.

Charts

Weekly charts

Year-end charts

References

1987 songs
1987 debut singles
British house music songs
Number-one singles in Switzerland
Phonogram Records singles
Mercury Records singles